H. Raymond "Ray" Price (18 January 1924 – September 1988) was a Welsh rugby union, and professional rugby league footballer who played in the 1940s and 1950s. He was regarded as one of the finest post-war Stand-offs in the sport.

At club level he played rugby union (RU) for Abertillery RFC, and at representative level he played rugby league (RL) for Great Britain, Other Nationalities and Wales. At club level for Belle Vue Rangers, Warrington (Heritage № 548) and St. Helens.

Background
Price was born in Blaina, Wales.

Playing career

International honours
Ray Price won caps for Wales (RL) while at Belle Vue Rangers 1948…1953 6-caps, won caps for Other Nationalities (RL) while at Warrington in 1955 2-caps, and won caps for Great Britain (RL) while at Warrington on the 1954 Great Britain Lions tour against Australia, and New Zealand (2 matches), in 1955 against New Zealand, in 1956 against Australia (3 matches), and in 1957 against France (2 matches).

Ray Price was selected for the Great Britain Squad while at Warrington for the 1957 Rugby League World Cup in Australia. However, Ray Price did not participate in any of the three matches.

Ray Price also represented Great Britain while at Belle Vue Rangers between 1952 and 1956 against France (1 non-Test match).

Championship final appearances
Ray Price played in Warrington's 8-7 victory over Halifax the Championship Final during the 1953–54 season at Maine Road, Manchester on Saturday 8 May 1954, in front of a crowd of 36,519.

Challenge Cup Final appearances
Ray Price played  in Warrington's 4-4 draw with Halifax in the 1954 Challenge Cup Final during the 1953–54 season at Wembley Stadium, London on Saturday 24 April 1954, in front of a crowd of 81,841, and played  in the 8-4 victory over Halifax in the 1954 Challenge Cup Final replay during the 1953–54 season at Odsal Stadium, Bradford on Wednesday 5 May 1954, in front of a record crowd of 102,575 or more.

County Cup Final appearances
Ray Price played  in Belle Vue Rangers' 7-10 defeat by Wigan in the 1947 Lancashire County Cup Final during the 1947–48 season at Wilderspool Stadium, Warrington on Saturday 1 November 1947.

Honoured at Warrington Wolves
Ray Price is a Warrington Wolves Hall of Fame inductee.

References

External links
Great Britain Statistics at englandrl.co.uk (statistics currently missing due to not having appeared for both Great Britain, and England)
Profile at saints.org.uk
U.K. League Hooker in Doubt
(archived by web.archive.org) Hall of Fame at Wire2Wolves.com
Statistics at wolvesplayers.thisiswarrington.co.uk

1924 births
1988 deaths
Abertillery RFC players
Broughton Rangers players
Footballers who switched code
Great Britain national rugby league team players
Other Nationalities rugby league team players
Rugby league five-eighths
Rugby league players from Bedwellty
Rugby union players from Bedwellty
St Helens R.F.C. players
Wales national rugby league team players
Warrington Wolves players
Welsh rugby league players
Welsh rugby union players